Pashto Academy is a language regulatory institution based at the University of Peshawar in Peshawar, Khyber Pakhtunkhwa, Pakistan responsible for the standardisation, advancement, and promotion of the Pashto language in Pakistan. It was established in 1955 with the support of the Government of Khyber Pakhtunkhwa, with Maulana Abdul Qadir serving as its first director. It was created following the precedent the Pashto Tolana in Kabul having been set up in 1937.  It is a research and publication institution with a focus on Pashto linguistic development and research. Areas studied and researched by the academy include Pashtun culture, literature, history, and the arts.

Activities
Since its inception, the Pashto Academy has produced over 500 publications in Pashto, which include classical texts, modern literature, critical literature, scientific works, translations, Pashto lexicon, research publications, booklets, and journals. The academy maintains a library which is host to a large collection of printed Pashto books, rare texts and manuscripts, media, tapes, and photographs of prominent scholars and poets. The academy also maintains a museum and art gallery, inaugurated in 2009, depicting Pashtun cultural heritage. A research cell has been set up at the academy which conducts studies on the life and works of Khushal Khan Khattak, regarded as one of the most notable classical Pashtun poets.

Directors 
Past and present directors of the Pashto Academy:
 Maulana Abdul Qadir 
 Mian Syed Rasool Rasa
 Syed Azeem Shah Khyal Bokhari 
 Mohammad Nawaz Tahir
 Raj Wali Shah Khattak
 Salma Shaheen 
 Dr. Nasrullah Jan Wazir (Current Director)

See also

 Academy of Sciences of Afghanistan – Pashto language regulation board in Afghanistan
 National Language Authority (Urdu) – National regulation board for Urdu
 Sindhi Language Authority – Sindhi language regulation authority
 Balochi Academy – Balochi language regulation academy

References

External links

 University of Peshawar Departmental Site for Pashto Academy
 
 

1955 establishments in Pakistan
Language regulators
Organisations based in Peshawar
Pashto
University of Peshawar
Government of Khyber Pakhtunkhwa